The 1981 Scottish League Cup final was played on 28 November 1981, at Hampden Park in Glasgow and was the final of the 36th Scottish League Cup competition. The final was contested by Dundee United and Rangers. Rangers won the match 2–1 thanks to goals by Davie Cooper and Ian Redford.

Match details

External links
 Soccerbase

1981
League Cup Final
Dundee United F.C. matches
Rangers F.C. matches
20th century in Glasgow